Yusef Lateef in Nigeria is an album by American multi-instrumentalist and composer Yusef Lateef recorded in 1983 and released on the Landmark label.

Reception 
The Allmusic review stated "Yusef Lateef had been a musical giant for three decades when this album came out, his first recording in several years. Unfortunately the emphasis here is on setting introspective moods and there is little development in the improvisations. Lateef (on tenor, flutes and vocals) is joined by five African percussionists and a variety of vocalists (including himself) and, despite good intentions, this session is quite forgettable."

Track listing 
 All compositions by Yusef Lateer
 "Mu, Omi (Drink Water)" – 6:31   
 "Drama Village" – 6:05   
 "Akima (Birth)" – 6:45   
 "Blues in the Adaji" – 5:47   
 "Lalit (Lovers' Separation)" – 4:19   
 "Curved Spacetime" – 5:29   
 "Ruwa Maizurufi (Deep Water)" – 4:20

Personnel 
 Yusef Lateef – Algaita, Flute, Oboe, Tenor, Vocals
 Awwalu Adamu, Salisu I. Mashi, P. Adegboyega Badejo, Yusufu Aminu, Shittu Isyaku – Percussion
 Amina Abdullahi, Esther Kawai, Tani Umaru, Veronica Ugye – Vocals

References 

Yusef Lateef albums
1985 albums
Landmark Records albums